Dawn Marie Kobayashi (born 18 June 1971 in Kingston) is a Jamaican sport shooter. She has been selected to compete for Jamaica at the 2004 Summer Olympics, setting a historic milestone as the nation's first ever sport shooter after forty years. Kobayashi trains for the Jamaica Air Rifle Association and the national team under the tutelage of Keith Hammond.

Kobayashi qualified as a lone shooter for the Jamaican squad in the women's 10 m air rifle at the 2004 Summer Olympics in Athens. She had been granted an Olympic invitation for her country by the ISSF and the IOC, having registered a minimum qualifying score of 391 from her eight-place finish at the 2003 Pan American Games in Santo Domingo, Dominican Republic. Kobayashi shot a decent 383 out of a possible 400 to force in a two-way tie with Nicaragua's Svitlana Kashchenko for forty-first place in the qualifying round, finishing just eight points off her entry best.

References

External links

1971 births
Living people
Jamaican female sport shooters
Olympic shooters of Jamaica
Shooters at the 2004 Summer Olympics
Commonwealth Games competitors for Jamaica
Shooters at the 2006 Commonwealth Games
Pan American Games competitors for Jamaica
Shooters at the 2003 Pan American Games
Sportspeople from Kingston, Jamaica
20th-century Jamaican women
21st-century Jamaican women